Balgownie Rangers Football Club is an association football club based in Balgownie, New South Wales. They play in the Illawarra District League. Founded in 1883, Balgownie is believed to be the oldest running association football club in Australia.

History
Balgownie Rangers is the oldest running registered association football club in Australia, being formed in 1883. The club was formed in 1883 where it played against other social clubs and also between Balgownie teams. In 1890, Balgownie Rangers was officially registered to play in the newly formed N.S.W. Football Association.

Balgownie was the 4th club to form in Australia. Wanderers, Arcadian and Granville had formed 1883. Since then all of these clubs have folded, Granville being the last to fold in the early 1980s, making Balgownie Rangers the oldest registered running soccer club in Australia.

The club is full of tradition and has produced many famous football players over the years. Some include James ‘Judy’ Masters (who is listed in the Football Australia Hall of Fame), Tom Thompson, Dave Ward and Frank Smith in the early 1900s, George Barlow in the 1950s and more recently Matt Horsley who went on to captain the Wollongong Wolves, win 4 National Soccer League titles and also represent Australia. Matt has recently retired his footballing career after finishing as captain of Perth Glory during December 2005.

Safeway United
In 1974, Balgownie finished second on the league table in NSW Federation Division Two earning promotion into NSW Federation Division One for the following year. Another team from the Illawarra was already competition in Division One called Safeway United. The club had previously had good success in Division One winning three minor premierships (1958 as Corrimal United, 1966 and 1969 as South Coast United) and one championship in 1963 (as South Coast United). For the 1975 season it was decided the clubs would pool their resources, merging as a single entity. The merged club would be called Wollongong City.

Seasons

References

External links
Balgownie Rangers FC Website

 
Soccer clubs in Wollongong
Association football clubs established in 1883
1883 establishments in Australia